{{Automatic taxobox
| taxon = Steeneichthys
| authority = Allen & Randall, 1985
| type_species = Steeneichthys plesiopsus
| type_species_authority = Allen & Randall, 1985<ref name = CoF>{{Cof record|genid=9886|title=Steeneichthys|access-date=29 September 2018}}</ref>
}}Steeneichthys is a genus of ray-finned fish in the family Plesiopidae, the longfins or roundheads.

Species
There are two recognised species in the genus:

 Steeneichthys nativitatus Allen, 1987 (Christmas longfin)
 Steeneichthys plesiopsus'' Allen & Randall, 1985 (Steene's prettyfin)

References

Plesiopinae